Zannini are a tribe of Fulgoromorphan insects.

Zannini may also refer to:
 Alain Zannini (born 1958), French writer, painter and jazz guitarist
 Carlos Zannini (born 1954), Argentine lawyer and politician